Ernst Leumann (11 April 1859 – 24 April 1931) was a Swiss jainologist, pioneer of the research of Jainism and  Turkestan languages whose work is in consideration even today.

Career
His studies on linguistics in Zürich and Geneva and of Sanskrit in Leipzig and Berlin were followed by his doctorate in 1881 in Strasbourg.

1882–84 working on Sanskrit-English Dictionary in Oxford. 
1884 Professor in Frauenfeld (Schweiz).
1884 Professor of Sanskrit at University Strasbourg. In 1909–10 he was dean.
1919 became honorary professor in Freiburg.

Publications

Author
Beziehungen der Jaina-Literatur zu anderen Literaturkreisen Indiens (Relations of Jain literature to other literature of India) 
Übersicht über die Āvaśyaka-Literatur Glossar (Overview on Āvaśyaka literature, glossary) 
Das Aupapâtika Sûtra, erstes Upânga der Jaina : 1. Teil – Einleitung, Text und Glossar  (Aupapâtika Sûtra, the first jain Upânga : part 1, introduction, text and glossary)
Die Nonne. Ein neuer Roman aus dem alten Indien  (The Nun, A new Tale from Old India)

Editor
Series Indica.

Posthumous publications

Literature
 Catalogue of the Papers of Ernst Leumann in the Institute for the Culture and History of India and Tibet at the University Hamburg

See also

 Sanskrit verbs

Notes

References

1859 births
1931 deaths
Jain philosophy
People from Berg Municipality
Swiss non-fiction writers